A Guilty Conscience is a 2023 Hong Kong trial drama film directed by written and directed by Jack Ng and starring Dayo Wong and Tse Kwan-ho.

A Guilty Conscience was released on 21 January 2023, coinciding with the Chinese New Year's Eve.

The film became the highest-grossing Chinese film in Hong Kong till now, surpassing 2022 film Warriors of Future.

Plot

Cast
 Dayo Wong as Adrian Lam
 Tse Kwan-ho as SC Kam
 Louise Wong as Jolene Tsang
 Fish Liew as Victoria Chung
 Michael Wong as James Tung
 Dee Ho as Prince
 Renci Yeung as Evelyn
 Bowie Lam as ICAC Asst Commissioner
 Vincent Kok as TK Ho
 Adam Pak as Desmond Cheung
 Sheldon Lo as Ben

References

External links
 
 
 
 
 

2023 films
Courtroom films
Films about domestic violence
Works about child abuse
Films about lawyers
2020s Cantonese-language films
Films based on actual events
Films set in Hong Kong
Films shot in Hong Kong
2023 directorial debut films